Adbaston is a civil parish in the Borough of Stafford, Staffordshire, England.  It contains 15 listed buildings that are recorded in the National Heritage List for England. Of these, one is at Grade II*, the middle of the three grades, and the others are at Grade II, the lowest grade. The parish includes the villages of Adbaston, Knighton, and Tunstall, and the surrounding countryside.  The Shropshire Union Canal passes through the parish, and the listed buildings associated with it are three bridges and a milepost.  The other listed buildings include a church, a churchyard cross, houses and associated structures, cottages, farmhouses and farm buildings.


Key

Buildings

References

Citations

Sources

Lists of listed buildings in Staffordshire